The Polish diaspora comprises Poles and people of Polish heritage or origin who live outside Poland. The Polish diaspora is also known in modern Polish as Polonia, the name for Poland in Latin and many Romance languages.

There are roughly 20,000,000 people of Polish ancestry living outside Poland, making the Polish diaspora one of the largest in the world and one of the most widely dispersed. Reasons for displacement include border shifts, forced expulsions, resettlement by voluntary and forced exile, and political or economic emigration.

Substantial populations of Polish ancestry can be found in their native region of Central and Eastern Europe and many other European countries as well as in the Americas and Australia.

The Polonia in English-speaking countries often uses a dialect of Polish called Ponglish. It is made up of a Polish core with many English words inside it.

There are also smaller Polish communities in most countries of Asia and Africa, most notably in Kazakhstan and South Africa.

History
Poles participated in the creation of the first European settlements in the Americas. In the 17th century, Polish missionaries arrived for the first time in Japan. Vast numbers of Poles left the country during the Partitions of Poland for economic and political reasons as well as the ethnic persecution practised by Russia, Prussia and Austria.

Many of the Poles who emigrated were Jews, who make up part of the Jewish diaspora. The Second Polish Republic was home to the world's largest Jewish population. It was followed by invasions of Poland by Germany and the Soviet Union. More than 3 million Polish Jews were murdered in the Holocaust by Nazi Germany during World War II. Most survivors subsequently migrated to Mandate Palestine since Poland was the only Eastern Bloc country to allow free Jewish aliyah without visas or exit permits at the end of the war. Many remaining Jews, including Stalinist hardliners and members of security apparatus, left Poland during the 1968 political crisis, when the Polish United Workers' Party, pressured by Leonid Brezhnev, joined the Soviet "anti-Zionist" campaign that was triggered by the Six-Day War. In 1998, Poland's Jewish population was estimated at 10,000 to 30,000.

A recent, large emigration of Poles took place after Poland acceded to the European Union and opening of the EU's labour market. About 2 million primarily young Poles took up jobs abroad.
Most Poles live in Europe, the Americas, and Australia, but a few Poles have settled in smaller numbers in Asia, Africa, and Oceania, as economic migrants or as part of Catholic missions.

Europe 
All countries and areas of residence thereafter are listed in alphabetical order.

Austria

Azerbaijan 

An estimated 2,000 ethnic Poles live in Azerbaijan.

Belarus 

According to the census, there are 396,000 Poles living in Belarus (official 1999 census; the estimates are higher according to various NGOs). They form the second-largest ethnic minority in the country, after Russians. Most Poles live in western Belarus (including 294,000 in the Grodno Region).

During the Second World War, the Soviet Union forcibly resettled large numbers of Belarusian Poles to Russia, Kazakhstan, and Uzbekistan. Few Belarusian Poles now live in Siberia and the Russian Far East, and some of those who managed to survive resettlement returned to Poland after 1956.

The census of 1959 had 538,881 ethnic Poles in Belarus (332,300 in Grodno Region, 83,800 in Vitebsk Region, 70,000 in Minsk Region including Minsk, 42,100 in Brest Region, 7,200 in Gomel Region and 3,500 in Mogilev Region).

Benelux
Polish immigration to the Netherlands has steadily increased since Poland joined the EU, and now 173,231 Polish people live in the country (2021, first generation. Most of them are guest workers from the European Union contract labour program, as more Poles obtain light industrial jobs. The number of Polish nationals could double in the next decade, depending on economic conditions in Poland. Most Poles in the Netherlands are in The Hague (30,000), but Polish émigrés have been long settled in Amsterdam and industrial towns or cities like Utrecht and Groningen. Polish immigrants arrived to find employment in the country in the 19th and 20th centuries.

Belgium has 70,000 Poles, but the number of Belgians of Polish descent could be as high as 200,000). Present queen of the Belgians, Queen Mathilde, is daughter to a Pole, Countess Anna Maria d'Udekem d'Acoz, née Komorowska.

Luxembourg has almost 3,000.

Czech Republic 

The Polish community in the Czech Republic is concentrated in Cieszyn Silesia (or Zaolzie), in the northeast of the country. It traces its origins to border changes after the First World War that partitioned the area between Poland and what was then Czechoslovakia, leaving many Poles on what is now the Czech side of the border. The Polish population was 51,968 at the 2001 census.

Denmark
It is estimated that around 40,000 Poles live in Denmark. Most live in the capital, Copenhagen.

Faroe Islands
Poles make up 0.2% of the population of the Faroe Islands, followed by Norwegians. Most live in the capital, Tórshavn.

Finland
The history of the Polish community in Finland dates from the early 19th century when many Poles from the Russian-controlled part of the country settled there. In 1917, there were around 4,000 Poles in Finland, mostly soldiers of the Russian Imperial Army, and almost all had returned to their homeland by 1921. Finland has never been a major destination for Polish immigrants, and only around 5,400 Poles live there. Most are well-educated: musicians, medical doctors, engineers and architects with families. Around half lives in Helsinki, and the biggest Polish organization there is the Polish Association, founded on April 3, 1917.

France

Between 500,000 and one million people of Polish descent live in France. They are concentrated in the Nord-Pas de Calais region, the metropolitan areas of Lille and Paris and the coal-mining basin (Bassin Minier) around Lens and Valenciennes. Prominent members have included Frédéric Chopin, Adam Mickiewicz, René Goscinny, Marie Curie, Michel Poniatowski, Raymond Kopa, Ludovic Obraniak and Edward Gierek. For centuries, there was an alliance between the France and the Polish–Lithuanian Commonwealth: the longest-reigning queen consort of France has been a Pole, Marie Leszczyńska. Many Poles settled in France after the rule of Napoleon and the collapse of the Duchy of Warsaw, when 100,000 Poles, largely political refugees, fled the Russians and Prussians, who took over Poland. The Great Emigration, from the first half of the 19th century onwards, caused many Poles to be enlisted to fight in the French army. Another wave of Polish migration took place between the two World Wars when many were hired as contract workers to work temporarily in France. Polish refugees also fled the Nazi and Soviet occupations in the 1940s. From 100,000 to 200,000 Poles have been estimated to live in Paris. Many EU immigrants are in southern France, including the cities of Arles, Marseille and Perpignan.

Germany

The second-largest Polonia in the world and the largest in Europe is the Polish minority in Germany. Estimates of the number of Poles living in Germany vary from 2 million to about 3 million.
The main Polonia organization is Kongres Polonii Niemieckiej / Polnischer Kongress in Deutschland. Polish surnames are very common in Germany.

Greece

The Polish minority in Greece numbers more than 50,000, most of whom are first-generation immigrants. There might be many more since the Greek Orthodox Church administers Greek names for marriage and christening. Statistics show that over 300,000 Poles visit Greece each year for tourism, especially during the summer months. Famous people with mixed Polish and Greek ethnicity include Polish singer Eleni Tzoka.

Hungary
The Polish minority in Hungary is around 10,000 and has a long history of over 1000 years. The Polish–Lithuanian Commonwealth included 16 towns of Hungarian territories and the Austro-Hungarian Empire (1867–1918) included the Polish region of Galicia. Hungary–Poland relations are strong and positive and best described in a poem, "Pole, Hungarian, two good friends," about the fraternal sense of commonality in both Polish and Hungarian cultures. Budapest is home to a large Polish community, and there are also ethnic Poles in the northern part of the country, bordering Slovakia and Ukraine. Most Polish-Hungarians are practising Roman Catholics, but many are members of the Eastern (Polish-Carpathian or Carpato-Ukrainian) and Greek Catholic Churches.

Iceland
The Polish minority in Iceland is relatively new. As of 2019, Poles constitute roughly 5% of the total population of Iceland and are, by far, the largest ethnic minority in the country.

Ireland

After Poland joined the European Union in 2004, Ireland immediately opened its borders and welcomed Polish workers as relatively cheap qualified labour (only the United Kingdom and Sweden did the same). Ireland quickly became a key destination for young Poles seeking work outside the country. According to the 2011 census, there are 122,585 Poles living in Ireland, the largest ethnic minority in the country.

Italy
The Polish minority in Italy is 97,986, but estimates have 130,000 Poles in Italy. Most Poles are late-20th-century immigrants drawn by the Italian economy's desire for imported labour. Large Polish immigrant communities are found in Rome, Milan and Venice. Polish immigration to Italy might continue while the EU contract labour program between the two countries remains in place.

Latvia
Poles form about 2.3% of Latvia's total population and number 51,548 people. They are mainly concentrated in Latvia's largest cities: Riga and Daugavpils. Since most of them don't use Latvian as their primary language their citizenship status can vary.

Lithuania

According to 2021 census, Poles are 6.52% of Lithuania's population and over 16% of Vilnius population.

Malta

Norway

Norway has recently experienced an influx of Polish migrant workers. This is because Norway is a member of the European Economic Area, providing the same free movement of labour as between members of the European Union. According to the Norwegian Statistics Burea, there are 108,255 Poles in Norway (2019 Official Norway estimate) and makeup 2.10% of the Norwegian population. It is the largest ethnic minority in the country.

Portugal 
There are, as of 2020, approximately 3,061 Poles in Portugal, mainly recent immigrants.

Romania

According to the 2002 census, 3,671 Poles live in Romania, mainly in the villages of the Suceava County. There are even three exclusively Polish villages: Nowy Sołoniec (Soloneţu Nou), Plesza (Pleşa), and Pojana Mikuli (Poiana Micului). Poles in Romania form an officially recognised national minority and have one seat in the Chamber of Deputies (currently held by Ghervazen Longher) and access to Polish elementary schools and cultural centres (known as "Polish Houses").

Russia and former Soviet Union

During the Second World War, the Soviet Union annexed large parts of Poland's former eastern territories of Kresy. Many Poles were expelled, but a significant number remained in what is now Belarus, Ukraine, and Lithuania. The Soviet authorities also forcibly resettled large numbers of Poles to Russia, Kazakhstan, and Uzbekistan. The following post-Soviet countries retain significant Polish minorities.
 Belarus – 396,000. See Polish minority in Belarus for details.
 Kazakhstan – between 60,000 and 100,000. See Poles in Kazakhstan.
 Lithuania – between 250,000 and 300,000. See the Lithuania section in this article and the Polish minority in Lithuania article for details.
 Latvia – between 60,000 and 75,000. See the Latvia section in this article and the Polish minority in Latvia article for details.
 Moldova and Transnistria – between 4,000 and 20,000. See Poles in Moldova and Poles in Transnistria for details. 
 Russia – about 300,000. See Polish minority in Russia for details.
 Ukraine – 144,000. See the Polish minority in Ukraine article for details.

Serbia
There is a small community of descendants of Silesian miners in Ostojićevo. In the 2011 census, 741 declared themselves as Poles.

Slovakia
According to the 2011 Slovak census results, there are 3,084 (0.1%) Poles living in Slovakia. Compared to the Hungarian census of 1910, there has been a significant decrease, as then there were 10,569 Polish-language speakers in the territory of present Slovakia.

Spain

The Polish minority in Spain numbers between 45,000 and 60,000. The Polish population is mainly guest workers who took advantage of Spain's economic boom during the 1990s. Madrid, Barcelona, Seville, San Sebastian and Valencia have significant Polish populations. The Polish minority in Spain is relatively young, 74% are between 20 and 49 years old.

Sweden

Like only the United Kingdom and Ireland, Sweden let Poles work in the country once Poland joined the European Union in 2004. The Poles in Sweden has been estimated to be around 103,191 people, 88,704 of who were born in Poland and 14,487 with both of their parents being born in Poland. Poles are thus Sweden's fifth-largest immigrant group, after Finns, Iraqis, former Yugoslavs (Bosnians, Croats, Serbs) and Syrians. Most of them are guest workers who have been invited to Sweden since 1990 by contracts with the Swedish government. Most Polish residents live in Stockholm, and the rest live south of the city, toward the Baltic Sea. Historically, Poland and Sweden had some cultural exchange, and the Swedish Empire occupied the Polish Baltic Sea coast (Gdańsk and Pomerania) in various times from the 13th to the 18th centuries.

Switzerland
Like the Polish community of Finland, some Polish diasporans from Germany were come from the Rhine-Ruhr basin, as immigrant workers to Switzerland. The biggest Polish diaspora community lives in Northern Switzerland.

Turkey
In 1842, Prince Adam Czartoryski founded the village of Adampol for Polish immigrants who came to Turkey after the failed November Uprising. The village still exists and is now called Polonezköy (Turkish for Polish Village). It is the main centre of the small but historic Polish community in Turkey.  The Polish minority in Turkey has been estimated to be around 4,000 people. However, it is higher than the Turkish census indicates because of Turkified Poles who marry Turks. For example, Leyla Gencer's mother was Atiye Çeyrekgil, who was born Alexandra Angela Minakovska and converted to Islam after the death of her husband. Also, Nazım Hikmet Ran's mother, Ayşe Celile Hanım, was a descendant of Mustafa Celaleddin Pasha, who was born as Konstantin Borzecki in 1826. He immigrated to Ottoman Empire after Greater Poland Uprising and embraced Islam in 1848. He later became an Ottoman General and died in 1876.

Ukraine

According to the 2001 Ukrainian census, 144,130 Poles were residing in the country.

Poles began settling in the territory of present Ukraine in the 14th century, after Red Ruthenia had become part of the Kingdom of Poland. The number of Poles in Ukraine gradually increased over the centuries, but after World War II, it drastically decreased, as a result of the Soviet mass deportation of the Poles in Ukraine to Siberia and other eastern regions of the USSR as well as a campaign of ethnic cleansing, which was carried out in the early 1940s by Ukrainian nationalists in the western part of the country (see Massacres of Poles in Volhynia). There was a Polish Autonomous District near Zhytomyr that was created in 1926, but it was disbanded in 1935 and its Polish inhabitants were either murdered or deported to Kazakhstan. The majority of those who survived the war in Ukraine were forcibly deported to the former eastern territories of Germany after Poland was shifted to the west by the Allied Potsdam Agreement after World War II.

United Kingdom

It was only after the First World War that Poles settled in large numbers in London – many from the Prisoner of War camps in Alexandra Palace and Feltham. During the Second World War many Poles came to the United Kingdom as political émigrés and to join the Polish Armed Forces in the West being recreated there. When the Second World War ended, a Communist government was installed in Poland and was hostile to servicemen returning from the West. Many Poles felt betrayed by their wartime allies and were understandably reluctant to return home. Many soldiers refused to return to Poland, and around 150,000, after occupying resettlement camps, later settled in the UK. The Polish Government in London was not dissolved until 1991 when a freely elected president took office in Warsaw.

After Poland entered the European Union in May 2004, Poles gained the right to work in some other EU countries. While France and Germany put in place temporary controls to curb Central European migration, the United Kingdom (along with only Sweden and Ireland) did not impose restrictions. Many young Poles have come to work in the UK since then.

Estimates for the total number of people now living in the UK and born in Poland or of Polish descent vary significantly. There were an estimated 831,000 Polish-born residents in 2015 and one million by 2017. Other than London, Poles have settled in Southampton in Hampshire, Manchester, Bolton and Bury in Greater Manchester and Chorley in Lancashire. There are also large concentrations in Bradford, Leeds, Coventry and Nottingham, as well as South Yorkshire, South Wales, Herefordshire, Rugby, Banbury, Slough, Redditch and Swindon.

The economic crisis in the UK and the growing economy in Poland reduced the economic incentive for Poles to migrate to the UK. By the last quarter of 2008, it was claimed by the IPPR that up to half of those that had come to the UK to work may have returned home. However, the 2011 UK Census also indicates that it was probably never true.

According to the UK Office for National Statistics, Poland had overtaken India as the most common overseas country of birth for foreign-born people living in the United Kingdom in 2015.

Vatican City 
Although they do not settle in the world's smallest country, many Polish priests spend time of their training studying in one of the universities of the Holy See in Rome.  The most famous Pole that has settled in Vatican City has been, for institutional reasons, former Archbishop of Kraków cardinal Karol Wojtyła, as Pope John Paul II (1978–2005).

North America

The United States and Canada were the major focus of Polish political and economic migration since 1850 up until the fall of the Iron Curtain.

Canada

According to the Canada 2016 Census, there are 1,106,585 Polish Canadians. The population is widely dispersed across Canada. The first Polish immigrants came to Canada in the 19th century. One of the largest concentrations of Polish-Canadians is in the Roncesvalles area of Toronto. The area holds an annual Polish Festival, Canada's largest. The Canadian Polish Congress is an umbrella organization, founded in 1944 by Polish Canadians to coordinate the activities and to articulate the concerns of the community on public policy issues.

United States
There are approximately 10 million Polish Americans living in the United States.

There are approximately 185,000 Polish-speakers in the Chicago metropolitan area. The Poles in Chicago are felt in a large number of Polish-American organizations the city such as the Polish Museum of America, the Polish American Association, the Polish National Alliance and the Polish Highlander's Alliance of North America.

Pittsburgh, Toledo, Cleveland, Detroit, Grand Rapids, Minneapolis, Buffalo, Brooklyn, Milwaukee, Philadelphia, Baltimore and New Britain also have very large Polish populations. Older Polish Americans are rapidly migrating to the Southeast (Florida), the Southwest (Arizona) and the West Coast (California) but also to Poland itself since the 1990s.Buffalo is seen as Polonia's second city in the US, as it is also home to many Polish-Americans. Its steel mills and automobile factories provided jobs for many Polish immigrants in the early 20th century. The only city to have official celebrations inspired by the popular Polish custom of Dyngus Day is Buffalo. A section of New Britain was officially designated "Little Poland" in 2007 by a unanimous vote of the city's Common Council.

The major Polonia organization is the Polish American Congress.

Mexico

The first Polish immigrants to Mexico arrived in the late 19th century. During World War II, Mexico received thousands of refugees from Poland, primarily of Jewish origin, who settled in the states of Chihuahua and Nuevo León.

Haiti

About 5,000 Poles fighting in Polish Legions in the Napoleonic armies were sent to fight against the rebelling Haitians. Many of the Poles who were sent there felt it wrong to fight against the Haitians who were fighting for their freedom—just like the Poles in the Napoleonic armies—and some 400 Poles changed sides. After the war, the Haitian constitution stated that because the Poles switched sides and fought for their cause, all Poles could become Haitian citizens. Many of the Poles who were sent to Haiti stayed there. Most of their descendants live in Cazale and Fond-des-Blancs.

South America
There has been political and economic migration of Poles to South America since the mid-19th century. The largest number went to Brazil, followed by Argentina.

Argentina

In Argentina, Poles are one of the most significant minorities, with around 500,000. The Parliament of Argentina has declared June 8 to be Polish Settlers' Day.

Brazil

The number of people of Polish descent in Brazil is estimated at 3 million. Most Polish Brazilians are Catholic, but there are nonreligious minorities. The oldest (1871) and largest concentration of Poles is in the city of Curitiba, Paraná. Another large community is to be found in Espírito Santo. Both are in the South and Southeastern Regions.

Chile

A small number of Poles came to Chile. The first came during the Napoleonic Wars. In the early 20th century, there were around 300 Poles in Chile, but they were considered Germans. After World War II, from 1947 to 1951, around 1,500 Poles, mostly Zivilarbeitero as well as some former soldiers and Nazi concentration camp inmates settled in Chile, and in 1949, the Association of Poles in Chile was founded. An estimate of 45,000 ethnic Poles live in Chile. Most live in Santiago de Chile. One of the notable Polish Chileans is Ignacy Domeyko.

Colombia

It is estimated that around 3,000 Poles live in Colombia, mostly in Bogotá.

Uruguay
Polish immigration in Uruguay brought Poles to settle in the late 19th and early 20th centuries. An estimated 10,000–50,000 Polish descendants are thought to live in Uruguay, mostly in Montevideo, the capital. Often, Poles came when the Germans and the Russians ruled Poland and so were known as "Germans" or "Russians".

Venezuela

The Polish colony in Venezuela is well dispersed throughout the country, but most of the Poles and their descendants live in big cities like Caracas, Maracaibo and Valencia.

Oceania

Australia

The first Polish settlers arrived in South Australia in 1856. After World War II, many displaced persons migrated from Poland to Australia, including soldiers from the Polish Independent Carpathian Brigade (the "Rats of Tobruk").

There are now 160,000 to 200,000 Polish Australians.

New Zealand

In 1944, more than 700 Polish orphans, survivors of forced resettlement of Poles to Soviet Siberia, and their caregivers were temporarily resettled at a refugee camp at Pahiatua, New Zealand. It was initially planned for the children to return to Poland after World War II ended, but as they had no homes or families to return to, they were eventually allowed to stay in New Zealand after the end of the war.

At the 2013 census, Polish New Zealanders numbered 1,944 by birth and 2,163 by ethnicity; of them, 42 percent lived in the Auckland Region and 23 percent in the Wellington Region.

Asia

Azerbaijan
In nation, there is a long history of Poles in Azerbaijan (Polish: Polacy w Azerbejdżanie, Azerbaijani: Azərbaycan polyakları). However the current Polish population of the Republic of Azerbaijan is smaller than in former times, the number of people of Polish descent in Baku is around 2,000 and several thousand self-identified Poles live in Azerbaijan. Poles as an ethnic group have lived in Azerbaijan for centuries. The Russian Empire included Azerbaijan and parts of Poland during the 19th century, this was a large cause of the Polish minority in Azerbaijan.

India
The Indian maharaja Digvijaysinhji Ranjitsinhji, following the news of Poland being divided by the Soviet Union and Nazi Germany at the World War II, had welcomed a large number of Polish refugees, mostly children. They were the first Polish group to be in India. After the war, a small number of Poles decided to stay, forming the first Polish diaspora group in India.

Japan
Recently 1,626 residents from Poland were registered in Japan from 2000 to 2018.

Kazakhstan
The first Pole to travel to Kazakhstan was probably Benedict of Poland, sent as part of the delegation of Pope Innocent IV to the Khagan Güyük of the Mongol Empire. Later more Poles came to Kazakhstan during the Post-Soviet times. Today these Poles live in Karaganda with a population of 47,300 people.

Israel
In the early years of Zionism, Jewish immigrants from Poland (then divided between Austria-Hungary, The Kingdom of Prussia and the Russian Empire) were a significant part of the ideologically motivated immigration to the then Palestine during the Second Aliya and the Third Aliyah. Many Jews of Polish origin had prominent roles in building up the Yishuv, the autonomous Zionist-oriented Jewish community in Mandatory Palestine from which Israel developed. In the aftermath of the Holocaust, many Jewish Displaced Persons in Europe who eventually got to Israel were also of Polish origin. In later generations, they generally abandoned the Polish and Yiddish languages, in favour of Modern Hebrew.
About 4,000 non-Jewish ethnic Poles live in Israel. There are also about 50,000 Jewish immigrants from Poland, with an affinity to the Polish language and culture and about 150,000 of their descendants with very little of that affinity left.

Pakistan

Philippines
During Spanish colonization, most Poles immigrated to the Philippines mostly for the Catholic clergy missionary work in other Asian countries. One of these Polish men was Wojciech Męciński a Jesuit missionary from Krakow. Later on, other Poles came to the Philippines but mostly they were Polish Americans, including Michael Sendzimir, a second lieutenant who worked in the 98th Infantry Division during World War II. Today the Polish community in the Philippines has about 93 people. Some of these Poles today come to the Philippines as immigrants, ex-pats, foreign exchange students, or settled down in the Philippines by their Filipino spouses. some members of the Polish community in the Philippines, include Robert Jaworski a basketball player and an ex-senator, Zaldy Zshornack (1937-2002) and an Australian Polish man Peter Pysk founded a Polish restaurant called Babci Kuchnia. Most of the Poles live in Metro Manila, and the Polish community is the Fourth-largest Central European community after the German, Hungarian, and Albanian communities in the country.

United Arab Emirates
Recently there are 2,000 Poles living in UAE, the Poles came to the UAE for work. Today the Polish Community in the UAE is the largest Polish population in the Arab World.

Africa

South Africa
According to the Council of Polonia in South Africa, 25,000 to 30,000 Poles live there. The Polish community in South Africa dates to World War II when the South African government agreed to the settlement of 12,000 Polish soldiers as well as around 500 Polish orphans who were survivors of forced resettlement of Poles to Soviet Siberia. More Poles came in the 1970s and 1980s, with several of them specialists coming for work contracts and deciding to stay there. Magda Wierzycka, who is Polish, is the wealthiest woman in South Africa.

List of countries by the population of Polish ethnicity

See also
 Demographics of Poland
 Great Emigration
 Hotel Lambert
 Polish Charter
 World Polonia Games

References

Bibliography 
 Marek Żukow-Karczewski, Polonia zagraniczna w czasach II Rzeczypospolitej (Foreign Polonia during the Second Polish Republik), "Życie Literackie", No. 33, 1989, p. 10.

External links

Reassessing what we collect website – Polish London History of Polish London with objects and images
Cultural Fusion: Poles in Latin America

 
European diasporas
Polish diaspora in Italy